In the Centralia mine disaster on March 25, 1947, the Centralia No. 5 coal mine exploded near the town of Centralia, Illinois, killing 111 people. The Mine Safety and Health Administration of the United States Department of Labor reported the explosion was caused when an underburdened shot or blown-out shot ignited coal dust. The US Department of Labor lists the disaster as the second worst US mining disaster since 1940 with a total of 111 men dead.

Mine conditions
The mine had received numerous warnings about conditions prior to the explosion. At that time, 142 men were in the mine; 65 were killed by burns and other injuries and 45 were killed by afterdamp. Eight men were rescued, but one died from the effects of afterdamp. Only 31 miners escaped.

In popular culture
American folksinger Woody Guthrie wrote and recorded a song about the Centralia mine disaster entitled The Dying Miner. Guthrie's recording of the song is now available on the Smithsonian-Folkways recording Struggle (1990).  Songwriter Bucky Halker rearranged this song and recorded it for his Welcome to Labor Land CD (Revolting Records, 2002), a collection of Halker's renditions of labor songs from Illinois. Halker also recorded his version of "New Made Graves of Centralia" for his CD Don't Want Your Millions (Revolting Records, 2000).  Halker based his version on an original recording of this song in the Country Music Hall of Fame, but the author and recording artist were unknown.

Along with The Dying Miner, Guthrie wrote two other songs regarding the 1947 disaster: "Waiting at the Gate" (from  the perspective of a miner's son); and "Talking Centralia" (also known as "Talking Miner").

References

Further reading
Death Underground: The Centralia and West Frankfort Mine Disasters.  Robert E Hartley, David Kenney. Southern Illinois University Press; 1st edition (July 24, 2006)

External links
"Centralia, Illinois, Mine № 5 (in Wamac, Illinois) Disaster of March 25, 1947" in Digital Research Library of Illinois History Journal, article written by Patricia Lofthouse, M.L.S. Edited by Neil Gale, Ph.D.
Public Sector Safety Professionals: Focused on Activity or Results? Fred Fanning. Spring 2007.

Centralia mine disaster
Centralia Mine disaster
Washington County, Illinois
Centralia mine disaster
Centralia mine disaster
1947 disasters in the United States
Labor movement in Illinois
March 1947 events in the United States